is a Japanese voice actress. She has been voice-acting since 1997 that worked for Toei Academy.

Ai is known for her role in Cutey Honey Flash as Honey Kisaragi, which was her debut role. She also voice Komachi Akimoto/Cure Mint in Yes! PreCure 5 and its sequel GoGo!, in addition to Madoka (Komachi's sister); and Yoshimi Takenochi in the inaugural Futari wa Pretty Cure. Also known as the voice of Suzie Wong, Miki Kurosaki, and Lady Devimon from Digimon Tamers. She was part of Office CHK, Wit Promotion, and Drama House in the past. She is currently signed to Bookslope.

Biography

Filmography

Anime
Air Gear (girl in Chinese dress #9)
Ashita no Nadja (Ms. Evans and Peter)
Cutey Honey Flash (Honey Kisaragi/Cutey Honey)
Digimon Adventure (Lady Devimon)
Digimon Savers (Miki Kurokawa)
Digimon Frontier (Nefertimon/Togemon (Ep 8))
Digimon Tamers (Reika Ootori and Shuichon Lee)
Futari wa Pretty Cure (Ms. Yoshimi Takenouchi)
Futari wa Pretty Cure Max Heart (Seekun)
Haruba-Ke no Sanninme (Kimchi)
Hataraki Man (Hiroko's friend (ep 3), Massage parlour employee (ep 7))
Kindaichi Shōnen no Jikenbo (nurse, Shiraishi (ep 64-67), waitress)
Kocchi Muite Miko (Yuuko Ogawa, [+ unlisted credits])
Mo~tto! Ojamajo Doremi (Reika Tamaki, Mary)
Ojamajo Doremi (Reika Tamaki)
Ojamajo Doremi Sharp (Reika Tamaki)
Ojamajo Doremi Dokkan! (Reika Tamaki)
SoltyRei (Rita Revant)
Ojarumaru (Akiko)
Yes! PreCure 5 & Yes PreCure 5 GoGo! (Komachi Akimoto/Cure Mint, Madoka Akimoto)
Konjiki no Gash Bell!! (Hiromi, Big Boing, Cherish, Daria Anjé)

Non-anime
True Love Story 2 (Akane Morishita)

Video games
Yes! Precure 5 (Komachi Akimoto/Cure Mint)

CD
Baccano! (Rachel)
Digimon Tamers (Lopmon and Shuichon Lee)

References

External links

1974 births
Living people
Japanese video game actresses
Japanese voice actresses
Voice actresses from Saitama Prefecture